Craig Berube (born December 17, 1965) is a Canadian professional ice hockey coach and former player. He is the head coach for the St. Louis Blues of the National Hockey League (NHL). Nicknamed "Chief", Berube played 17 seasons in the NHL for the Philadelphia Flyers, Toronto Maple Leafs, Calgary Flames, Washington Capitals and New York Islanders. Also, Berube was a national team scout hired by Doug Armstrong for team Canada's 2016 World Cup of hockey team. As an interim coach in 2019, Berube led the Blues to become the Stanley Cup champions.

Playing career
Berube played 1054 NHL regular season games between 1986 and 2003. He was known as an enforcer in the NHL and amassed 3,149 penalty minutes in his career, good for seventh on the all-time list.

Berube was signed as an undrafted free agent by the Philadelphia Flyers on March 19, 1986. He made his NHL debut on March 22, 1987, recording 16 penalty minutes which included two fighting majors, in a 3–1 Flyers win over the Pittsburgh Penguins. He remained with the Flyers through the end of the regular season and also played in five playoff games during the Flyers' run to the 1987 Stanley Cup Finals. Berube cemented his place in the Flyers' line-up during the 1988–89 season and finished in the top ten in penalty minutes during the next two seasons.

Following the 1990–91 season, Berube was traded three times in a span of a little over seven months, twice in the off-season. The Flyers traded him to the Edmonton Oilers along with Craig Fisher and Scott Mellanby for Dave Brown, Corey Foster, and Jari Kurri on May 30. Four months later he was traded to the Toronto Maple Leafs along with Glenn Anderson and Grant Fuhr for Vincent Damphousse, Peter Ing, Luke Richardson, and Scott Thornton on September 19. Berube played the first half of the 1991–92 season with Toronto before he was traded again on January 2, 1992 to the Calgary Flames along with Alexander Godynyuk, Gary Leeman, Michel Petit, and Jeff Reese for Doug Gilmour, Jamie Macoun, Kent Manderville, Ric Nattress, and Rick Wamsley.

Berube remained with the Flames through the end of the 1992–93 season. He was traded on June 26, 1993 to the Washington Capitals for a fifth-round draft choice in the 1993 NHL Entry Draft. He spent the next six seasons with the Capitals, notably playing in every playoff game during Washington's run to the 1998 Stanley Cup Finals.

During a November 1997 game against the Florida Panthers, Berube called Panthers' forward Peter Worrell, who is black, "a monkey." Berube claimed the remark was not racially motivated and he apologized to Worrell a day after the game. The NHL suspended Berube for one game.

Berube returned to the Flyers in 1999 during the trade deadline. He saw his last Stanley Cup playoff action on the ice in 2000. In game four of the Eastern Conference Finals he scored the game-winning goal to put the Flyers up 3–1 in the series against the New Jersey Devils, but the Flyers lost the next three games and the series.

Berube split the next three seasons between the Capitals, New York Islanders, and the Flames. He ended his playing career as a player-assistant coach with the Philadelphia Phantoms, the Flyers American Hockey League affiliate, during the 2003–04 season.

Coaching career
Berube was named the head coach of the Philadelphia Phantoms, the Flyers' affiliate in the American Hockey League, prior to the 2006–07 AHL season. However, on October 23, 2006, Berube was promoted to the Flyers' NHL coaching staff after a major reorganization in the franchise. On October 22, 2006, Bob Clarke had resigned from his position as general manager of the Flyers, and head coach Ken Hitchcock was released from his duties. John Stevens, formerly assistant coach, was named the Flyers' new head coach, and Berube was designated to replace him. For the 2007–08 season, Berube returned to the Phantoms as head coach. On October 7, 2013, Berube was named head coach of the Philadelphia Flyers following an 0–3–0 start. The team improved their play following the change to Berube, and clinched a spot in the 2014 NHL playoffs. On April 17, 2015, Berube was relieved of his coaching duties by Flyers general manager Ron Hextall.

On June 29, 2016, Berube was named the head coach of the Chicago Wolves in the American Hockey League, the affiliate of the St. Louis Blues.

On June 15, 2017, Berube was named the assistant head coach of the St. Louis Blues. On November 19, 2018, the Blues fired head coach Mike Yeo and named Berube interim coach for the rest of the season.  The Blues struggled at first under Berube's watch; at the start of the 2019 calendar year, they were 15–18–4 and last in the league standings. However, they improved through the remainder of the season, going 30–10–5, including a franchise-record 11-game winning streak. As the third seed in the Central Division, they advanced to the Stanley Cup Finals for the fourth time in franchise history, and the first time since 1970. The Blues later won the series 4–3 over the Boston Bruins, capping off Game 7 with a 4–1 win, earning the Blues their first Stanley Cup title in franchise history and Berube his first Stanley Cup championship as a player or coach.

Berube became the third interim head coach in NHL history to guide his team to a Stanley Cup title. Berube shares this distinction with Blues senior advisor Larry Robinson, who accomplished the feat 19 years earlier with the New Jersey Devils. Dan Bylsma led the Pittsburgh Penguins to a Stanley Cup also as an interim coach in 2009. 

On April 26, 2019, Berube, Jon Cooper, and Barry Trotz were announced as the finalists for the Jack Adams Award. On June 24, the Blues dropped the "interim" tag from Berube's title and officially named him as the 26th head coach in franchise history, with a three-year contract.

On February 9, 2022, the Blues signed Berube to a three year contract extension, through the 2024–25 season.

Personal life
Berube is of First Nations descent. During his time coaching the Flyers, he and Buffalo Sabres head coach Ted Nolan were the only head coaches in the NHL of First Nations ancestry. On November 21, 2013, Berube (Cree) and Nolan (Ojibwe) made history as the first time in NHL history both coaches were of First Nations descent.

Career statistics

Head coaching record

 Season shortened due to the COVID-19 pandemic during the 2019–20 season. Playoffs were played in August 2020 with a different format.

See also
 List of NHL players with 1,000 games played
 List of NHL players with 2,000 career penalty minutes

References

External links

 

1965 births
Living people
Calgary Flames players
Canadian ice hockey coaches
Canadian ice hockey left wingers
Cree people
First Nations sportspeople
Hershey Bears players
Ice hockey people from Alberta
Ice hockey player-coaches
Kamloops Blazers players
Medicine Hat Tigers players
National Hockey League assistant coaches
New Westminster Bruins players
New York Islanders players
People from Sturgeon County
Philadelphia Flyers coaches
Philadelphia Flyers players
Philadelphia Phantoms players
St. Louis Blues coaches
Stanley Cup champions
Stanley Cup championship-winning head coaches
Toronto Maple Leafs players
Undrafted National Hockey League players
Washington Capitals players